Euophryum confine is a species of weevil native to Europe.

References

Curculionidae
Beetles described in 1881
Beetles of Europe